Fairbanks is a center of media in central Alaska. The following is a list of media outlets based in the city.

Print

Newspapers
The Fairbanks Daily News-Miner is the city's primary newspaper, published daily. In addition, the University of Alaska Fairbanks publishes a weekly student newspaper, The Sun Star.

Radio
The following is a list of radio stations licensed to and/or broadcasting from Fairbanks.

AM

FM

Television
The Fairbanks television market includes all of Fairbanks North Star Borough, the western half of Southeast Fairbanks Census Area, and a portion of southern Yukon–Koyukuk Census Area. In its Fall 2013 ranking of television markets by population, Arbitron ranked the Fairbanks market 202nd in the United States.

The following is a list of television stations that broadcast from and/or are licensed to Fairbanks.

References

Fairbanks
 Fairbanks